An Incident in the Rebellion of 1745 is an oil painting, by the Anglo-Swiss artist David Morier (c. 1705–1770). It is part of the art collection of the British royal family. It depicts a scene during the 1746 Battle of Culloden, in which a group of Jacobite Scottish Highland soldiers charge a group of soldiers of the government army of Great Britain.

Background

The Battle of Culloden was the last battle of the Jacobite rising of 1745. This rising was an attempt by Charles Edward Stuart to remove King George II from the British throne, and replace him with his father, James Francis Edward Stuart.

The battle was fought on 16 April 1746, on Drummossie Moor near Inverness in the Scottish Highlands. The Jacobite army was commanded by Charles Stuart and the British government army commanded by Prince William, Duke of Cumberland, the son of George II. The battle lasted around an hour and resulted in a bloody defeat of the Jacobites.

Painting
Swiss-born artist David Morier began working for the Duke of Cumberland in 1747, and continued to receive payments from him until 1767. At an unknown date before 1765 he completed An Incident in the Rebellion of 1745. The painting is thought to be one of a set of four he painted for Cumberland that depict battle scenes.

Morier may have been present at the Battle of Culloden. Many sources state he used Jacobite prisoners as models, but this is disputed, and claimed to be a legend that arose in the 19th century.

The Jacobite soldiers

The eight Jacobite soldiers wear 20 different tartans between them. Tartan was often worn by the Jacobite forces and sympathisers to signify the defence of Scottish nationality, as well as distinct clans. They also wear white cockades in their bonnets, which show their allegiance to the Stuart cause.

The highlanders are primitively armed – none carry firearms, instead they are armed with broadswords, dirks and targes (shields). Some have Lochaber axes, a nearly obsolete type of Scottish pole weapon. This may reflect Hanoverian, anti-Jacobite propaganda, which sought to portray the Jacobite highlanders as barbaric, backward and savage.

The Jacobites had been poorly armed at the start of the rising. But by the time of Culloden, France and Spain had supplied them with around 5000 modern muskets and bayonets. Some Jacobites carried captured British Brown Bess muskets or Scottish-made pistols. It is known that all Jacobite soldiers were eventually armed with muskets, but some employed the tactic of firing one shot, then dropping their firearm to engage in hand-to-hand combat with their broadswords and dirks. James Ray, who was present during the battle on the government side, notes in his later book that this happened in the fighting the painting depicts.

The government soldiers

The government troops depicted are grenadiers of the 4th King's Own (Barrell's) Regiment. The regiment fought on the left flank of the government army, at the southern end of the battlefield, and took the brunt of the Jacobite chargeit suffered the heaviest casualties on the government side, with 18 dead and 108 wounded out of 373. The regiment's commander was among the wounded, losing his left hand.

The soldiers can be identified as grenadiers by the mitre caps they wear, and would be the regiment's tallest, strongest and most experienced men. The most prominent soldier, nearest the viewer, wears a red sash that indicates he's an officer. He is armed with a fusila smaller, lighter version of the muskets carried by his men. This was usual for grenadier officers. Other officers (such as the half-obscured one behind the group) carried a spontoon. In the distance, more soldiers can be seen, as well as part of the King's Colour, one of the regiment's flags.

Background
Two walled farm enclosures were features of the southern end of the battlefield, where the 4th Regiment fought. A small part of a stone structure may be seen in the left of the painting, which may be part of one of the enclosures.

Location

The painting now hangs in the lobby of the Palace of Holyroodhouse. The room contains a number of items associated with the 1745 rising. These include portraits of James Francis Edward Stuart and the Duke of Cumberland. There is a late-19th century, historical painting of Charles Edward Stuart, a knife and fork that belonged to him, and a sword and pistols that were traditionally said to have belonged to him.

A later engraving based on the painting is the collections of the Scottish National Gallery.

Notes

References 
Citations

Bibliography

British paintings
War paintings
18th-century paintings
Cultural depictions of British men
Jacobite rising of 1745
Paintings in the Royal Collection of the United Kingdom
Paintings in Edinburgh